DWCQ (98.3 FM), broadcasting as 98.3 Radyo Kidlat, is a radio station owned and operated by Zambales 2 Electric Cooperative (ZAMECO 2). The station's studio and transmitter are located at ZAMECO 2 Main Office, National Highway, Brgy. Nagbunga, Castillejos. It is the first radio station owned by an electric cooperative.

References

Radio stations in Olongapo
Philippine Broadcasting Service
Radio stations established in 2021